David James Hey (1905–1967) was an Australian rugby league footballer who played in the 1920s and 1930s.

Playing career
Hey and his brother Vic Hey both played with the Western Suburbs club although Dave was 6 years older than his famous brother. 

He played three seasons with Wests, went to the bush in 1930 and had one final season with the St. George club, playing one game with them in 1931. He moved to other rural areas in the 1930s, he captain/coached Cootamundra 1932, Glen Innes 1933 and Kiama, New South Wales in 1934. 

Hey was still coaching A grade in the Fairfield/Smithfield area in the 1940s.

Hey also served in World War II between 1943 and 1946.

Death
Hey died at Smithfield, New South Wales on 13 May 1967.

References

1905 births
1967 deaths
Australian military personnel of World War II
St. George Dragons players
Western Suburbs Magpies players
Australian rugby league players
Rugby league players from Sydney
Rugby league centres